John Edward Powell Dunn (28 March 1917 – 16 July 1938) was a British figure skater who competed in the 1930s. His best finish was a silver medal at the 1935 World Figure Skating Championships.

Dunn was a close friend and lover of Sonja Henie, who was training in London towards the end of her competitive career.  Following Henie's victory at the 1936 Winter Olympics, where Dunn placed sixth in the singles event, he accompanied the Henie family to the United States and became her professional skating partner in her touring ice show for the next two years.  Their relationship ended when Henie became involved with Tyrone Power. Shortly afterward, in 1938, Dunn died from tularemia contracted from handling a rabbit while on a hunting trip in Texas. He died in Hollywood.

At the time of his death Dunn had appeared in the movie Everybody's Girl, been cast by producer Edward Small in the lead of The Duke of West Point (1938) and was in the running to play Rudolph Valentino in a film based on that actor's life.

Results

References

External links
 
 Skatabase
 Raymond Strait and Leif Henie:  Queen of Ice, Queen of Shadows:  The Unsuspected Life of Sonja Henie.  .

1917 births
1938 deaths
British male single skaters
Figure skaters at the 1936 Winter Olympics
Olympic figure skaters of Great Britain
Infectious disease deaths in California
World Figure Skating Championships medalists